Seyl Mish may refer to:

Seyl Mish-e Olya, Robat, Khorramabad, Lorestan, Iran; a village
Seyl Mish-e Sofla, Robat, Khorramabad, Lorestan, Iran; a village